Mescinia is a genus of snout moths described by George Hampson in 1901.

Species
 Mescinia berosa Dyar, 1914
 Mescinia commatella Zeller, 1881
 Mescinia estrella Barnes & McDunnough, 1913
 Mescinia parvula (Zeller, 1881)
 Mescinia texanica Neunzig, 1997
 Mescinia triloses Dyar, 1914

References

Phycitinae
Taxa named by George Hampson
Pyralidae genera